Bill W. McClard (born October 15, 1950 in Purcell, Oklahoma) is a former professional American football player.

A kicker, McClard played college football for the University of Arkansas, where he was named American Football Coaches Association All-America after the 1970 season and by The Sporting News in 1971.  He kicked a then-NCAA record 60-yard field goal in 1970. This was only about one week before Tom Dempsey, with his half-foot, kicked the first 60+-yard field goal in the NFL. Both were responsible for changes in rules regarding returning field goal attempts.

Out of college, McClard was drafted in the 3rd round of the 1972 NFL Draft by the San Diego Chargers. He played one year for the Chargers, kicking two field goals during his rookie season. For the next three seasons, McClard played for the New Orleans Saints, where he was successful on 26 of 51 field goal attempts and 31 of 32 extra points.

Since retiring from football, McClard has been a commercial real estate broker in Rogers, Arkansas.<ref></ref

McClard now has two children Matthew McClard, Rachel McClard and two grandchildren Hayden McClard, Lucille McClard

References

1950 births
Living people
People from Purcell, Oklahoma
American football placekickers
New Orleans Saints players
San Diego Chargers players
Arkansas Razorbacks football players
People from Rogers, Arkansas
University of Arkansas alumni